Dario De Toffoli is an Italian board game designer, gamebook author, and games player who founded the games company Studiogiochi and established many games events. Born in 1953 Venice, after an early career as a chemist he entered the world of games. Winner of over 60 medals at the Mind Sports Olympiad. He won the 2002 and 2012 Pentamind Competition for the best games all-rounder in the world. In 2006, he won a special award for his contribution to games which includes contribution to all aspects of games.

Contribution to games
The Personalità Ludica dell'Anno (PLDA) award the prize to the games personality of the year. In 2006, instead of the normal competition the PLDA made a lifetime achievement award to Dario De Toffoli for his "career" in games.

In the 90's Dario, with the help of his company, staged the first 5 Italian Festivals of games, the largest in Italy. Other significant events established by Dario include the Mind Sports player competition Giocatore dell'Anno and the Venice International Backgammon Tournament.

Another event that Dario established is one of the few board game design competitions: the Premio Archimede (the Archemedes prize), dedicated to Alex Randolph, an international competition where along with the prize the winner has their game displayed in the Swiss museum of games.

Scrabble in Italian
Dario was one of the top players in scrabble in Italian. The world championship in Italian scrabble was not founded until 2008 before that there were Majors. Dario had multiple top 3 finishes in these competitions and won the Masters in 1997.

Backgammon
Dario De Toffoli is the foremost expert in backgammon in Italy. He wrote two of the key books on backgammon in Italian: "the rules of the game" and "the big book of backgammon" 
In the latter, he is credited with bringing to light that the origins of backgammon went back 500 years further than had previously been reported.
He is also a successful backgammon player having won numerous competitions and produced a book on the subject for La Stampa newspaper. He is a top class player having world rating of over 1500 at the end of the 2009 season.

However, Dario's impact on the game is most significant through his involvement in establishing the European backgammon scene. The Venice International Backgammon Tournament established by De Toffoli  was one of the first two major backgammon tournaments in Europe along with the Nordic Open Backgammon Tournament. The tournament is one of the most important in the world  and forms part of the European Backgammon Tour

Poker
Dario wrote the first book on Texas Hold'em in Italian and has since then co-written two more of the only books in Italian on poker with Max Pescatori. Dario is primarily known for being a leading technician in the game being asked for views on poker and as a TV commentator as he has yet to win a major cash tournament.
In 2008, Dario became the Amateur Poker World Champion an event that is not played for money.

Games All-rounder
Dario is one of the most successful games players of all-time. Perhaps his most notable achievement is as an all-round games player. He has won championships in games ranging from Oware to world championships in two new games: Continuo in 2002 and David Parlett's Hare and Tortoise in 2010.
He has won over 60 medals at the Mind Sports Olympiad. In 2002 he became the oldest winner of the Pentamind World championship  an event to find the best games all-rounder in the world. This victory was achieved in the middle of Demis Hassabis 5 victories to whom he had earlier managed to finish second against.

Games Journalist
Dario has contributed hundreds of articles and puzzles for newspapers and magazines. His contributions include for Giochi Magazine, Il Gazzettino and for La Stampa newspaper.

Game and Puzzle Book Author
As well as strategic books De Toffoli is one of the leading authorities on games having written "the encyclopedia of games" and the "1001 games for everyone". His works also include several puzzle books and a book on draughts.

Games Designer
As well as owning the company Studiogiochi, Dario has personally designed and co-designed several board games. The most notable of which are Lex Arcana and Vampiri in salsa rossa role-playing based games. More recent games have had a more mainstream focus such as Sudoku and Kakuro board games and themed board games such as for the Totally Spies! cartoon series.

List of Games Designed
 
 Kluges Kopfchen
 Totally Spies
 Poker Cinese
 Trova le mine
 Joker Poker
 Happy birthday!
 Nebraska
 Babar et le mistere des lettres perdues
 Kakuro challenge
 Kakuro (board game)
 Challenge Sudoku
 Mango Tango
 Sudoku (board game)
 Challenge Sudoku - Kakuro Challenge
 Number one
 Ketch up
 Yummy
 Buon compleanno
 Adventure cards
 Dummy
 Theseus
 I giochi della frutta
 Abaco zuzzurellone
 Lex Arcana
 Jagd der Vampire
Detective

List of Books Written
 Dario De Toffoli, Max Pescatori & Giorgio Sigon, A scuola di Poker, Sperling & Kupfer, 2010, 
 Giampaolo Dossena & Dario De Toffoli, Enciclopedia dei giochi, Mondadori, Milan, 2009, 
 Max Pescatori & Dario De Toffoli, Giocare e vincere a poker online, Sperling &Kupfer, Milan, 2009, 
 Dario De Toffoli & Leo Colovini, Il grande libro degli scacchi, 
 Dario De Toffoli, Il grande libro del Backgammon, Stampa Alternativa, 2008, 
 Dario De Toffoli & Dario Zaccariotto, 1001 Giochi per tutti, Mondolibri, Milan, 2008, 
 Dario De Toffoli, Dario Zaccariotto & Leo Colovini, Brainquiz, Sperling & Kupfer, Milan 2008, 
 Dario De Toffoli, Dario Zaccariotto & Margot De Rosa, Numeri, Stampa Alternativa, Viterbo, 
 Dario De Toffoli, Il grande gioco del Poker, Mondadori, Verona, 2008
 Dario De Toffoli, Il grande libro del Poker, Sperling and Kupfer, Milan, 2007ISBN 978-88-2004-389-6
 Dario De Toffoli & Dario Zaccariotto, Cibo per la mente - Vol III, Stampa Alternativa, Viterbo, 2007, 
 Dario De Toffoli & Dario Zaccariotto, KAFKA, Sperling and Kupfer, Milan, 2007
 Dario De Toffoli & Dario Zaccariotto, Sfida al quadrato, Sperling and Kupfer, Milan, 2006, 
 Dario De Toffoli & Dario Zaccariotto, Cibo per la mente II, Stampa Alternativa, Viterbo, 2005, 
 Dario De Toffoli, Il giocatore consapevole, Stampa Alternativa, Viterbo, 2004, 
 Dario De Toffoli & Dario Zaccariotto, Cibo per la mente I, Stampa Alternativa, 2004, 
 Dario De Toffoli, Guida al poker, Conde Nast, Milan, 2004
 Dario De Toffoli, Giochi, Unicopli, Viterbo, 2003, 
 Dario De Toffoli, Backgammon, Tutte le regole del gioco, Nuovi Equilibri, Stampa Alternativa, Viterbo, 2002, 
 Dario De Toffoli, Giocare e vincere a Poker, Stampa Alternativa, 2002, 
 Dario De Toffoli, Dario Zaccariotto, Michele Comerci & Claudio Borgnino, Giocare con le parole, La Scuola, Brescia, 2000
 Dario De Toffoli & Dario Zaccariotto, Dama, Unicopli, Viterbo, 2000 
 Dario De Toffoli, Nel mondo dei cruciverba, Unicopli, Viterbo, 2000, 
 Dario De Toffoli, Scala quaranta, pinnacolo e dintorni, Unicopli, Viterbo, 2000, 
 Dario De Toffoli, Backgammon, La Stampa, 1999
 Dario De Toffoli, Giocare a Backgammon, Arsenale, Venice, 1991 
 Dario De Toffoli, Giocare a Scarabeo, Sansoni Editore, Florence, 1985

References

External links
 studiogiochi website
 Video interview for la stampa alternativa 

Italian backgammon players
Italian poker players
Scrabble players
Board game designers
Gambling writers
Living people
Year of birth missing (living people)